Choplifter HD is a video game developed by inXile Entertainment and released on January 10, 2012.  It is a 3D polygonal remake of the 1982 game Choplifter by Dan Gorlin. inXile hired Gorlin to serve as a design consultant for the game. As in the original game, players fly missions in a helicopter, defeating enemies and rescuing people. Originally released for Windows, Xbox 360 and PlayStation 3, the game was subsequently ported to the Ouya as well as Android devices. Choplifter HD was lauded for being true to the original, retaining the gameplay the series was known for, but was criticized for its high level of difficulty.

Gameplay
Players take the role of a helicopter pilot for an elite rescue squad called Coordinated Helicopter Operations, Preservation and Rescue (C.H.O.P.R.) The game retains the same basic objectives as the original Choplifter, including the basic side-scrolling gameplay, only now with 3D polygonal graphics. Choplifter HD features 3 main campaigns and 30 different missions, as well as a tutorial level. The player completes missions by piloting the helicopter into hostile territory while evading or destroying enemies and dealing with the helicopter's depleting fuel supply by refilling at either the copter's home base of fuel depots scattered around the level. Missions normally involve picking up and dropping up various passengers. new features were added such as dying passengers who have a timer associated with them as well as zombie enemies. Levels now have enemies in the foreground that can only be defeated by facing in their direction. Players can also unlock improved helicopters by collecting stars in each mission. Three difficulty modes are available, with the harder difficulty modes making enemies harder to defeat and the copter's fuel deplete faster.

Development
The game was announced in March 2011 for release on PlayStation 3 (via the PlayStation Network) and Windows. An Xbox Live Arcade release was subsequently confirmed that following June. inXile founder Brian Fargo was a fan of the first Choplifter, having played the original game on the Apple II. The original game's designer, Dan Gorlin served as a design consultant on Choplifter HD and Fargo credited Gorlin with contributions such as "connect(ing) the pilot to the rescued hostages in a meaningful way".

Originally slated for a release in Fall 2011, the game was pushed back for a winter release with Konami signing on to release the Xbox Live Arcade version.

Reception

Choplifter HD was met with mixed reviews on release. The game was credited with being faithful to the original, with Destructoid's Maurice Tan commenting that "the core gameplay of Dan Gorlin's classic Apple II title remains largely intact in this HD revisiting" and GameSpot's Sean Evans writing that the remake "retains the core gameplay for which the series is known". However, it was criticized for its difficulty, particularly the unrelenting incoming fire from enemies, which Ryan Winterhalter of 1up.com compared to that of a bullet hell shooter. Evans opined that players "will eventually hit a wall with the difficulty that robs you of all desire to continue", while Winterhalter called Choplifter HD "the ideal game for perfectionists with a flair for self-flagellation". Despite this, some reviewers found that the difficulty added to the game's enjoyment, with Christian Donlan of Eurogamer calling it "pleasantly punishing" and Mitch Dyer of IGN commenting that "frustrations are rare in Choplifter HD because its constant concern is that you're having a good time".

References

External links
 

2012 video games
InXile Entertainment games
Games for Windows certified games
Helicopter video games
PlayStation 3 games
PlayStation Network games
Xbox 360 games
Xbox 360 Live Arcade games
Ouya games
Android (operating system) games
Windows games
Horizontally scrolling shooters
Video games developed in the United States
Video games with 2.5D graphics
Video game remakes
Unreal Engine games